Gleb Sergeyevich Retivykh (born 30 December 1991) is a Russian cross-country skier specializing in sprint.

On 3 February 2017, Retivykh won his first World Cup title in Pyeongchang, South Korea, in classic sprint. Three days later, he also won the team sprint with Andrey Parfenov.

He competed at the FIS Nordic World Ski Championships 2017 in Lahti, Finland.

Cross-country skiing results
All results are sourced from the International Ski Federation (FIS).

World Championships
3 medals – (1 silver, 2 bronze)

World Cup

Season standings

Individual podiums
1 victory – (1 ) 
6 podiums – (5 , 1 )

Team podiums
 2 victories – (2 ) 
 6 podiums – (6 )

Notes

References

External links

1991 births
Living people
Russian male cross-country skiers
Tour de Ski skiers
FIS Nordic World Ski Championships medalists in cross-country skiing
People from Chaykovsky, Perm Krai
Sportspeople from Perm Krai